Eterno, released on June 20, 2000, is the second studio album by Puerto Rican singer Luis Fonsi.

Track listing
 "Imagíname Sin Tí" – 4:08
 "Déjame o Dame Amor" – 3:13
 "Eterno" – 4:14
 "Te Vuelvo a Encontrar" – 3:55
 "Dentro de Mi Corazón" – 4:23
 "Dime Si Tú (How About You)" – 4:28
 "No Te Cambio por Ninguna" – 3:41
 "Cuanto Quisiera" – 4:32
 "Dime Cómo Vuelvo a Tener Tu Corazón (Show Me the Way Back to Your Heart)" – 3:50
 "Mi Sueño" - 4:17
 "Love Me or Let Me Go" - 3:15
 "Imagine Me Without You" - 4:11
 "Sería Fácil" - 3:50

Charts

Sales and certifications

References

2000 albums
Luis Fonsi albums
Albums produced by Rudy Pérez